Norwegian county road 410 (Fylkesvei 410 or Fv410) is a Norwegian county road which runs for  between the Harebakken mall in Arendal municipality and Rødmyr in Tvedestrand municipality.  Prior to 2010, this was a Norwegian national road, but in the transportation reforms that year, the road was transferred to county control.

The northern end of the road begins at the junction of the European route E18 highway and it heads south a short distance into the town of Tvedestrand. The road intersects with Norwegian County Road 411 in the town. The road passes through the villages of Borås, Vatnebu, Strengereid, Eydehavn, and Saltrød before finally entering the town of Arendal. At Barbu, the road turns north into the Barbudalen valley. It passes the Arendal Station before intersecting with Norwegian County Road 420. The road passes the Harebakken mall before reaching the southern terminus of the road at the junction with the European route E18 highway.

References

410
Road transport in Agder
Arendal
Tvedestrand